The Argentina national cricket team is the team that represents the country of Argentina in international cricket. The team is organised by the Argentina Cricket Association (ACA), which became an associate member of the International Cricket Council (ICC) in 1974.

With the sport having been introduced by British immigrants, Argentina played its first international cricket match in 1868, against Uruguay, with fixtures against Brazil and Chile following in 1888 and 1893, respectively. Beginning in 1912, there were regular visits from English teams, including the Marylebone Cricket Club (MCC) on two occasions. On four of those tours, matches between the Argentine national side and the visiting team were accorded first-class status, making for thirteen first-class matches in total between 1912 and 1938. Argentina, Brazil, and Chile, the mainstays of South American cricket, commenced regular international matches in the 1920s, which have continued into the present-day (outside the period surrounding World War II). The South American Championship was created in 1995 by those three teams and Peru, and is now held annually. Argentina has been the dominant team at the championship, winning ten out of the sixteen tournaments held, and consequently has sent only development sides since 2000 (until 2019 when the matches in the event were eligible for Twenty20 International status for the first time).

Argentina made its ICC tournament debut at the 1979 ICC Trophy in England, which was the first event staged only for associate members. The team failed to appear at the subsequent 1982 edition, but from 1986 to 2001 appeared in five consecutive tournaments. However, Argentina only won its first match at the 1990 tournament, when it defeated East and Central Africa. The team won four matches in division two at the 2001 edition, but has made no further appearances in what has now been renamed the World Cup Qualifier. In the early 2000s, Argentina was one of the leading associates in the ICC Americas region, and in 2007, when the World Cricket League (WCL) was established, the side was placed into Division Three. Promoted into Division Two later in the year, it was immediately relegated, and continued to drop divisions over the following years. Finally, after placing fourth at the 2013 Division Six event, Argentina lost its place in the global tournament system. The team is yet to re-qualify, instead competing only in regional tournaments.

History

Background

Cricket has been played in Argentina since 1806, with the international side making its first appearance in 1868 against Uruguay. Argentina faced Uruguay 29 times up until World War II, winning 21 of the matches. The team had previously played against Brazil in 1888 and then against Chile in 1893. For its first match against Chile, the national team had to travel to Santiago by crossing the Andes by mule, which took three and a half days.

First-class cricket
Argentina first played first-class cricket in 1912 against the Marylebone Cricket Club. The national team played a three match series against the visitors, winning the first game, but losing the second and third. The teams were made up almost exclusively of British expatriates who were mostly employed on the railways, in export or in farming.

Between the wars, infrequent fixtures were played against Brazil and Argentina, and were at that time included in Wisden's cricket records. First-class matches were played against an elderly MCC side in 1926/27, Sir Julien Cahn's XI in 1930 and Sir Theodore Brinckman's XI in 1937/38. The four-match series against the MCC was lost 2–1, with one game drawn. The three-match series against Sir Julien Cahn's XI finished with two draws, Cahn's XI winning the first game and the series against Brinkman's XI was drawn 1–1. That series was Argentina's last involvement in first-class cricket to date.

Players and clubs

In 1932 a South American team consisting mainly of Argentine-based players toured England. It played seven first class matches and twelve other fixtures.

A two match series against Chile in December 1938 was won by Argentina, the second match of which saw the interesting occurrence of Argentina's Alfred Jackson playing against his brother John Jackson.

Leading players during this period were the Ayling brothers, K. Bush (who also played for Brazil), D. Cavanagh, Herbert Dorning (the so-called "Grand Old Man of Argentine Cricket") and Donald Forrester.

A strong club scene existed until the 1950s with Belgrano, BACA, Lomas and Hurlingham. This resulted in a relatively strong national side. Railway and Bank teams disbanded after the war along with the formerly strong San Isidro side. The national side sank to a low level, being heavily beaten by MCC in 1958–59.

By 2010, cricket had made some positive strides in Argentina even if the national side was struggling somewhat.

San Jorges, Lomas, Belgrano, Hurlingham and San Albano were as strong as they had been for some time along with Buenos Aires Cricket and Rugby Club, which was once again fielding sides after a long absence. Bedes Grammar School and Club Atletico Rosario were both working their way through the lower divisions of the domestic league and supplying many players to the national age group squads, while an Academy side had been introduced into the First Division in response to the growing number of young players from the Italian/Spanish majority that were taking up the sport.

Previously the club competition had been kept alive largely by Anglo-Argentines – many of whom were descendants of well known cricketing identities in the country going right back to the early 20th century. In all, more than 30 teams at senior level comprised from the eight clubs were competing in four divisions and there was also a quickly growing ladies league.

ICC Trophy
Argentina participated in the first ICC Trophy in 1979 but missed the second in 1982 which was played in England and started only two days after the conclusion of Falklands War. They returned for the 1986 ICC Trophy and played in every one following that until the 2001 event. They did not qualify for the 2005 tournament.

Americas Championship

Argentina hosted and won the first South American Championship in 1995 and still play in the tournament today, though they now send an "A" team. They also participated in the first ICC Americas Championship in 2000, finishing 5th. MCC visited again in March 2001, winning both matches.

Argentina hosted the Americas Championship in 2002, finishing sixth. MCC toured again in 2004, drawing the series 1–1. Later that year, Argentina finished 5th in the Americas Championship.

In 2006, the Americas Championship was split into two divisions and Argentina were placed in Division Two. They won the Division Two tournament and were promoted to Division One in Canada that August, where they finished 5th.

In 2008 they finished 5th with only one victory coming against newcomers Suriname. The inclusion of coach Hamish Barton in the team proved successfully specially when he scored 99 not out against Canada. Argentina ended being beaten in a nail-biting finish by 1 wicket.

World Cricket League

This originally qualified them for Division Five of the World Cricket League, but they were placed in Division Three following the suspension of the USA from international cricket. They finished as runners-up to Uganda in the tournament and qualified for Division Two in Windhoek, Namibia.

Following their promotion, in November 2007, Argentina traveled to Namibia to take part in Division Two of the ICC World Cricket League. They played Denmark, the hosts, Oman and the UAE in addition to the other qualifier from Division Three; Uganda. Division Two proved to be a step too far for Argentina, as they lost all their group matches and then lost to Uganda in a positional playoff and finished sixth. On the basis of their sixth-place finish in this tournament, Argentina were relegated back to Division Three for the 2009 tournament which Argentina hosted from 24 to 31 January 2009. However, Argentina again struggled, losing all five of their games to finish bottom of the table and were relegated to the Division Four. In Division 4 their downfall continued and lost all the games thus relegated to Division Five. Then again in Division 5 they lost all the matches and have now been relegated to Division Six. Argentina have lost considerable form over time and with present ways they may go down the WCL structure.

In 2013, Argentina took part in Division Six of the World Cricket League and came fourth. In normal circumstances it meant they will play Div 6 in 2015 but ICC is going for a change of structure of World Cricket League and Argentina might go out of the WCL Structure unless they fight back which looks tough.

2018-Present
In April 2018, the ICC decided to grant full Twenty20 International (T20I) status to all its members. Therefore, all Twenty20 matches played between Argentina and other ICC members after 1 January 2019 will be a full T20I.

Argentina played their first T20I match against Mexico on 3 October 2019 during the 2019 South American Cricket Championship in Peru

In October 2019, Argentina won 2019 South American Cricket Championship after defeating
Mexico by four wickets in the final

Tournament history

World Cricket League
 2007: Division Three runners-up
 2007: Division Two Sixth place
 2009: Division Three Sixth place
 2010: Division Four Sixth place
 2012: Division Five Sixth place
 2013: Division Six Fourth place

ICC Trophy
 1979: First round
 1982: Did not participate
 1986: First round
 1990: Plate competition
 1994: Plate competition
 1997: 20th place
 2001: First round
 2005: Did not qualify
 2009: Did not qualify
 2014: Did not qualify

ICC Americas Championship
 2000: 5th place
 2002: 6th place
 2004: 5th place
 2006: Division Two winners, 5th place (Division One)
 2008: 5th place (Division One)
 2010: 4th place (Division 1 – 50 overs)

South American Championship
 1995: 1st place
 1997: 1st place
 1999: 1st place
 2000-2018
2019: 1st place

ICC T20 World Cup Americas Qualifier
2018-19: 3rd/3 (Southern sub region)
2021: 4th/7

Squad
Argentina's squad for the 2023 ICC Men's T20 World Cup Americas Sub-regional Qualifier:

 Hernán Fennell (c)
 Bruno Angeletti
 Pedro Arrighi
 Pedro Baron
 Ramiro Escobar (wk)
 Alejandro Ferguson
 Agustin Husain
 Alan Kirschbaum
 David Mauro
 Lautaro Musiani
 Augusto Mustafa
 Agustin Rivero
 Santiago Rossi
 Tomas Rossi
Reserves:
 Guido Angeletti
 Pedro Bruno
 Santiago Duggan

Records & Statistics

International Match Summary — Argentina
 
Last updated 4 March 2023

Twenty20 International 
 Highest team total: 171/4 v. Belize on 10 November 2021 at Sir Vivian Richards Stadium, Antigua.
 Highest individual score: 86*, Alejandro Ferguson v. Belize on 10 November 2021 at Sir Vivian Richards Stadium, Antigua.
 Best individual bowling figures: 6/18, Hernán Fennell v. Panama on 10 November 2021 at Sir Vivian Richards Stadium, Antigua.

Most T20I runs for Argentina

Most T20I wickets for Argentina

T20I record versus other nations

Records complete to T20I #2013. Last updated 4 March 2023.

Other records

Performances by Argentina cricketers in World Cricket League matches since 2007

Performances by Argentina cricketers in World Cricket League matches since 2007

Highest Scores 

 Matias Paterlini – 114* vs Namibia at United Cricket Club, Windhoek on 25 November 2007
 Martin Siri – 78 vs Jersey at Grainville, St Saviour on 25 July 2013
 Donald Forrester – 71 vs Uganda at Trans Namib Ground, Windhoek on 1 December 2007
 Lucas Paterlini – 70 vs Cayman Islands at Belgrano ACG, Buenos Aires on 28 January 2009
 Alejandro Ferguson – 66* vs Oman at Trans Namib Ground, Windhoek on 24 November 2007

Best bowling figures

 Esteban Nino – 4/16 vs Fiji at Kahlin Oval, Darwin on 30 May 2007
 Esteban MacDermott – 4/20 vs Cayman Islands at Gardens Oval, Darwin on 31 May 2007
 Esteban MacDermott – 4/22 vs PNG at Gardens Oval, Darwin on 28 May 2007
 Diego Lord – 4/34 vs PNG at St Albans Club, Buenos Aires on 25 January 2009
 Lucas Paterlini – 4/45 vs Kuwait at Farmers Cricket Club Ground, St Martin on 24 July 2013

See also
 List of Argentina Twenty20 International cricketers
 Argentina national women's cricket team
 South American Cricket Championship

References

External links
 

Cricket in Argentina
National cricket teams
Cricket, Men's
Argentina in international cricket